John Thomas McDonough (b. July 12, 1843 Birdhill, County Tipperary, Ireland – d. March 21, 1917 Washington D.C.) was an American lawyer and politician.

Early life
He came with his parents to the United States in 1850, and they settled in Dunkirk, New York. He graduated from St. John's College, and studied law at Columbia Law School, finishing as Bachelor of Laws in 1861. He was admitted to the bar in 1869.

Political career
He served two terms as Police Magistrate at Dunkirk, N.Y., and in 1876 was elected Special Surrogate of Chautauqua County, New York, serving until 1878. Afterwards he resumed his law practice, at times in New York City, in Buffalo, New York, and from 1881 on in Albany, New York. In 1884 he ran for Recorder of the City of Albany, but was defeated. In 1891, he ran in the Third Judicial District for Justice of the New York Supreme Court, but was defeated by Democrat D. Cady Herrick. He was a delegate to the New York State Constitutional Convention of 1894. In 1896, he was appointed by Governor Levi P. Morton New York State Commissioner of Statistics of Labor.

He was Secretary of State of New York from 1899 to 1902, elected in 1898 and 1900. In 1899, his old college conferred the degree of Doctor of Laws on him. From June 17, 1903, to May 1, 1904, appointed by President Theodore Roosevelt, he was an Associate Justice of the Supreme Court of the Philippines. He was a delegate to the 1904 Republican National Convention from the Philippines.

In 1907, he ran on the Independence League ticket for the New York Court of Appeals but was defeated.

Business
He was President of the Dulangan Mining Interests Co., Inc., Director of El Oriente Fabrica de Tabacos, Inc., Managing Director of the Golden Gate Mining Association, and a member of the Board of Directors of the Philippine Realty Corporation.

Sources
 His nomination as Labor Commissioner, with drawing, in NYT on March 31, 1896
 His doctorate from St. John's College (Fordham), in NYT on June 4, 1899
 Bio at Philippines Supreme Court
 Short bios of the candidates for state office, in NYT on September 28, 1898 (stating erroneously his age as 53)
 The 1894 Constitutional Convention's delegates' Ten Year Memorial Dinner at Delmonico's, calling McDonough "Chief Judge of the Philippines", in NYT on July 23, 1904

Associate Justices of the Supreme Court of the Philippines
Politicians from County Tipperary
1843 births
Year of death missing
Fordham University alumni
Columbia Law School alumni
Secretaries of State of New York (state)
Irish emigrants to the United States (before 1923)
New York (state) Republicans
United States Independence Party politicians
People from Dunkirk, New York